Hebeloma louiseae is a species of mushroom in the family Hymenogastraceae. The species was first found in Svalbard and named as a distinct species of Hebeloma in 2016. It has subsequently been collected in Greenland.

References

louiseae
Fungi of Europe